I'm from Barcelona is a Swedish pop group from Jönköping, Sweden, best known for its 29 band members and eclectic mix of instruments such as clarinets, saxophones, flutes, trumpets, banjos, accordions, kazoos, guitars, drums, and keyboards among others.  While most band members provide backing vocals on releases and during live performances, Emanuel Lundgren is founder, principal songwriter and lead singer for the group.

In 2006 the band released an EP entitled Don't Give Up on Your Dreams, Buddy! as well as a full-length album, Let Me Introduce My Friends – both of which were well-received critically. Their second full-length album, Who Killed Harry Houdini?, was released in October 2008.

History
Sometime in 2005 Emanuel Lundgren wrote several songs and gathered his friends to record them. Weeks later, a homemade EP was completed and a one-time live show featuring all 29 band members was performed in August 2005.

I'm from Barcelona's story was only beginning, however, as the Swedish media and bloggers around the world started buzzing about the band.  EMI Sweden signed the band and Dolores Recordings released the EP Don't Give Up On Your Dreams, Buddy! on February 15, 2006 featuring the band's first hit "We’re From Barcelona", named as an homage to the Spanish waiter Manuel, a character on BBC Television's Fawlty Towers ("He’s from Barcelona"). Their debut full-length, entitled Let Me Introduce My Friends, was released on April 26, 2006 in Sweden, with international releases to follow including an EMI UK release on 11 September 2006. In 2006 Lundgren did a Take-Away Show video session shot by Vincent Moon.

In July 2008, it was announced that the band would be releasing a full-length album in fall 2008, entitled Who Killed Harry Houdini? The album features French singer Soko on the track "Gunhild". The album was released on October 14, 2008 and to promote it they toured the UK finishing at the Scala, London on the 25th of November 2008.

They also made an appearance on the children's program Yo Gabba Gabba in 2008.

Their song "The Painter" appeared in the CBS television show How I Met Your Mother, in the episode "Everything Must Go", aired on May 12, 2008.

A version of their song "Get in Line" has been used in European adverts for Babybel cheese since 2012, whereby the band re-recorded the song with a children's choir.

Members

Discography

Albums

EPs

Singles

Other singles
2005: "Sing!!"
2006: "Collection of Stamps"
2006: "Treehouse"
2006: "Britney"
2008: "Paper Planes"
2009: "The Painter"
2011: "Come On"
2011: "Always Spring"
2011: "Oversleeping"
2011: "Headphones"
2012: "Battleships"

Music videos
"Collection of Stamps"  By Daniel Eskils & Johan Junker
"We're From Barcelona"  By Andreas Nilsson & Rasmus Hägg
"Violins"

Collaborations
"Here We Go A Wassailing" on the Shrek the Halls movie soundtrack (2007).
Adventure Kid  Emanuel Lundgren, the creative motor of I'm from Barcelona and the electronica/bitpop artist Kristoffer Ekstrand also known as Adventure Kid shocked the audience by forming a two men strong electronic I'm from Barcelona in fall of 2006. A remix of the band's We're From Barcelona recorded by Adventure Kid has been played at the end of the band's shows during 2006
Loney, Dear

References

External links

Swedish pop music groups
Swedish indie rock groups
Mute Records artists
Musical groups established in 2005